Kylemore  is an unincorporated community in the Rural Municipality of Sasman No. 336, Saskatchewan, Canada. Listed as a designated place by Statistics Canada, the community had a population of 0 in the Canada 2016 Census. It was designated as an organized hamlet prior to 2018. The community is located 12 km east of Wadena, and approximately 250 km east of Saskatoon.

Canada's first aboriginal urban reserve was established here in 1981.

History 
Kylemore relinquished its organized hamlet designation on December 31, 2017.

Demographics 

See also 
 List of communities in Saskatchewan

References 

Sasman No. 336, Saskatchewan
Designated places in Saskatchewan
Unincorporated communities in Saskatchewan
Ethnic enclaves in Saskatchewan
Division No. 10, Saskatchewan